The 2016 Torneo Descentralizado de Fútbol Profesional (known as the 2016 Copa Movistar for sponsorship reasons) was the 100th season of the highest division of Peruvian football. A total of 16 teams competed in the season.

Competition modus
The season is divided into four phases. The first phase is the Torneo Apertura with all teams playing each other once either at home or away. The second phase is the Torneo Clausura with all teams entering this phase with their points won in the Torneo Apertura and all teams play each other once either at home or away. The third phase is the Liguilla phase with all teams entering this phase with the points they earned at the end of the Torneo Clausura. In this phase, the teams are divided into two groups and play each team in their group twice at home and away. The two teams with the fewest points in the overall table at the end of the Liguila phase are relegated. The final phase is the Playoffs where the four teams with the most points enter the semifinals. The semifinals are played over two legs. The semifinal winners advance to the two-legged finals and the losers advance to a single leg third place playoff.

The champions, runners-up, and third place playoff winners advance to the 2017 Copa Libertadores. The Torneo Apertura winners, Torneo Clausura winners, and third place playoff losers qualify to the 2017 Copa Sudamericana. The remaining Copa Sudamericana berth is awarded to the team with the best record on the aggregate table that has not qualified for any 2017 international tournament.

Teams
A total of 16 teams have been confirmed to play in the 2016 Torneo Descentralizado. Fourteen teams from the previous season, the 2015 Segunda División champion (Comerciantes Unidos), and the 2015 Copa Perú champion (Defensor La Bocana).

Stadia and locations

Torneo Apertura
The Torneo Apertura was the first stage of the season and culminated with Universitario leading the table earning them a provisional place in the 2016 Copa Sudamericana.

Standings

Results

Torneo Clausura

Standings

Results

Liguillas

Liguilla A

Liguilla B

Aggregate table
All stages (Torneo Apertura, Torneo Clausura, and Liguilla) of the 2016 season are aggregated into a single league table throughout the season to determine the teams that advance to the Playoffs, qualify for international competitions, and are relegated at the end of the season.

Playoffs

Semi-finals

First leg

Second leg

Third place play-off
The two losing semi-finalists will play in a match to determine the third place team of the season.

Universitario won the third place play-off and qualified for the 2017 Copa Libertadores Second Stage. Municipal qualified for 2017 Copa Libertadores First Stage.

Finals
The two winning semi-finalists will contest the finals.

Sporting Cristal and Melgar qualified to the 2017 Copa Libertadores Group stage.

See also
 2016 Torneo de Promoción y Reserva
 2016 Peruvian Segunda División
 2016 Copa Perú

References

External links 

  
Tournament regulations 
Torneo Descentralizado news at Peru.com 
Torneo Descentralizado statistics and news at Dechalaca.com 

2016
2016 in Peruvian football